OCE refers to:
 Office of Congressional Ethics for the  U.S. House of Representatives
 French Polynesia, ITU country code (for Établissements français d'Océanie)